"As I Love You" is a 1958 hit song by Shirley Bassey with Wally Stott & His Orchestra, written by Jay Livingston and Ray Evans for the Universal International motion picture, The Big Beat (1958).

From 20 February 1959, it was number one on the UK Singles Chart for four weeks.

References

1958 songs
1958 singles
Songs with music by Jay Livingston
Songs with lyrics by Ray Evans
Shirley Bassey songs
UK Singles Chart number-one singles
1950s ballads